Die Wölfe (English: The Wolves of Berlin) is a 3-part German miniseries directed by Friedemann Fromm. The three episodes were broadcast for the first time on 29 January and 2–3 February 2009 on ZDF.

Background 
The series deals with the story of a Berlin youth gang. The first episode (Nothing Can Separate Us) is set in 1989 then flashes back to 1948 with the Berlin blockade. The next (Broken City) is set in 1961 when the Berlin Wall is erected. The final (Hope for Luck) returns to 1989 and reunification.

Cast 
Axel Prahl ... Bernd Lehmann
Barbara Auer ... Lotte
Matthias Brandt ... Jakob Lehn
Johanna Gastdorf ... Silke
Felix Vörtler ... Kurt Ripanski
Ulrike Krumbiegel ... Mutter Lehmann
Sven Lehmann ... Vater Lehmann
Alma Leiberg ... Miriam Lehmann
Florian David Fitz ... Thomas Feiner
Mike Maas ... Herr Meinrath

Awards

References

External links
 

2009 German television series debuts
2009 German television series endings
German-language television shows
2000s German television miniseries
International Emmy Award for Best TV Movie or Miniseries
ZDF original programming
Television series set in the 1940s
Television series set in the 1960s
Television series set in the 1980s
Grimme-Preis for fiction winners